The Chicago Express were a professional ice hockey team located in Hoffman Estates, Illinois, serving the Chicago market.  The Express were a member of the North Division of the ECHL's Eastern Conference. The team played its home games at the Sears Centre.

The Express were owned by Craig Drecktrah, who formerly owned the United Hockey League's Chicago Hounds and Rockford IceHogs.

It was announced on July 13, 2011 that the Express would be affiliated with the NHL's Columbus Blue Jackets and the AHL's Springfield Falcons.

On April 6, 2012, it was announced that the Chicago Express would cease operations due to poor attendance numbers and lack of support. The Express finished last in the league for average attendance with 2,508. On some nights, the Express, which also had AHL and NHL competition in the same market, was struggling to get 1,000 spectators at its games.

Team history

Inception 
The team formed out of talks between owner Craig Drecktrah and officials at the Sears Centre. On the heels of the Chicago Hounds folding in 2009 after only playing one season (2006–07) at the Sears Centre, Drecktrah worked with arena and Hoffman Estates village officials to bring in an ECHL franchise. The league approved the franchise's application at the ECHL's annual Board of Governors Meeting in June 2010.

Team name 

To name the new franchise, the team held a special name the team contest that eventually received over a thousand unique name suggestions.  On July 22, the four finalists for the team name were unveiled.  They were the Chicago Blizzard, Hoffman Estates Hammers, Chicago Knights and Chicago Express. Voting for the team's name closed on August 4, with Express announced as the winner on September 21.  The final four portion of the contest received a total of 20,000 votes.

2011-2012 season 
Under the direction of Steve Martinson, the Express finished with a record of 34-26-8-4, good enough for 80 points and second place in the North Division, four points behind the division leading Kalamazoo Wings. However, this was only good enough for ninth in Eastern Conference. They were actually tied with the eighth place Reading Royals points wise, however they missed out on the playoffs because the Royals had more wins.

The Express fold 
At the end of the season, the Express folded outright. There were a myriad of reason for this. Firstly, the Express could not hope to compete with the Chicago Blackhawks (NHL) and the Chicago Wolves (AHL). The team had no radio and television deals, and were not promoted on those mediums. The team also had a hard time drawing fans to Hoffman Estates from the heart of the city.

Mascot 
The mascot for the Chicago Express was "Traxx" the Horse.

Players

Skaters

Goaltenders

All player statistics taken from the ECHL.com.

Team captain
Nathan Lutz, 2011–12

References

External links 
Official website of the ECHL

 
Defunct ECHL teams
Hoffman Estates, Illinois
Columbus Blue Jackets minor league affiliates
Express
Ice hockey clubs established in 2010
Ice hockey teams in Illinois
Defunct ice hockey teams in Illinois
Sports clubs disestablished in 2012